Dayer may refer to:
Dayer, Khuzestan, a village in Iran
Bandar Deyr, a city in Bushehr Province, Iran
Dayêr, village in Tibet